Rabbi Shergill (born Gurpreet Singh Shergill on 16 April 1973) is an Indian musician well known for his debut album Rabbi and the chart-topper song of 2005, Bullah Ki Jaana  ("I know not who I am!"). His music has been described variously as rock, Punjabi, with a bani style melody, and Sufi-style (sufiana), and "semi-Sufi semi-folksy kind of music with a lot of Western arrangements." Shergill has been called "Punjabi music's true urban balladeer".

Career
After college Shergill formed a band named Kaffir. The band played in some competitions and college festivals before parting ways. Shergill initially composed jingles for advertisement agencies such as Yamaha RX-T motorbikes and Times FM. He had an unsuccessful stint with Sony Music and Tehelka before finally releasing his debut album Rabbi in 2004 under Phat Phish Records. Relying on word-of-mouth publicity and a music video, he had a chart topper song "Bulla Ki Jaana".  Most of the songs in the album were composed and written by Shergill himself except for "Bulla ki Jana" based on the Kafi poem written by the Punjabi Sufi saint Bulleh Shah. "Heer" from "Heer" by Waris Shah and "Ishtihar" by Shiv Kumar Batalvi. Shergill had one song "Dilli" in the Hindi movie, Delhii Heights.

In October 2008, Shergill released his second album Avengi Ja Nahin under Yashraj Music. The album contains nine songs and deals with issues like communal violence, social responsibility and the need for "collective morality". He also appeared in MTV Unplugged (India) in 2011. He lent his voice to Yash Chopra's 2012 romantic film Jab Tak Hai Jaan singing the leading number "Challa" composed by A. R. Rahman and the lyrics penned by Gulzar. In March 2012, he released his third album III.

Musical style
Shergill's principal contribution to music lies in the use of Punjabi — which previously had a reputation similar to that of either Bhangra or traditional folk — to create acoustic rock-based ballads, providing a new musical perspective to this language. And with his poetic, socially relevant lyrics and an adult alternative sound, Shergill instantly connected with an urban crowd who loved him for his genuine and original approach to his songs. His songs are deeply philosophical and blend archaic, almost lost, Punjabi phrases into more recent Indian rock music.
Shergill's music has been inspired by Rock as well as Sufi and Punjabi folk music. His favourite musicians include Bruce Springsteen, Led Zeppelin, Aerosmith and Jimmy Page. He has also worked with award-winning mix engineer Gustavo Celis, who helped him out with some tracks for his album III. "Working with Celis — who has worked with artists including Beyonce, Shakira and Ricky Martin — was an amazing experience," he says.

Personal life
Shergill's father was a Sikh preacher and his mother is a college principal and also a Punjabi poet. He has four sisters. He is an alumnus of Guru Harkrishan Public School, India Gate and University of Delhi. After college, he went for further studies at the Fore School of Management but dropped out a year later. His sister Gagan Gill is a well known Hindi poet. Shergill publicly supported Aam Aadmi Party led by Arvind Kejriwal attending a rally in support of the party in 2013 Delhi Legislative Assembly election.

Discography

Studio albums
 Rabbi (2004)
 Avengi Ja Nahin (2008)
 III (2012)

Singles 

 Raj Singh (2019)
 Sahi Aeh Vi (2019)
 Taläsh (2019)
 Pahiläñ (2020)

Film soundtracks
 Waisa Bhi Hota Hai 2, "Laundiya Ke Pallu Mein" (2003)
Delhii Heights, "Tere Bin", "Kitni Der" (2007)
Dharti, "Bandiya Tu" (2011)
 Jab Tak Hai Jaan, "Challa" (2012)
 Raanjhanaa , "Tu Mon Shudi" (2013)
Chaar Sahibzaade - Rise of Banda Singh Bahadur (2016)
 Romeo Akbar Walter, "Bulleya" (2019)
 Happy Hardy and Heer, "Aadat" (2020)

References

External links
Odd One Out Records
Rabbi Shergill's official website

Punjabi music
Punjabi poetry
Performers of Sufi music
Punjabi people
1973 births
Living people
Indian Sikhs
Bollywood playback singers